Coppock may refer to:

 Coppock, Iowa, a city in the United States
 Coppock (surname)
 Coppock curve, a stock market bottom indicator